Sennertia is a genus of mites in the Chaetodactylidae family. There are more than 70 species. Some of these mites are parasites or commensals of bees, but the presence in some bees of specialized structures for carrying mites (acarinarium) indicates the mutualistic nature of the relationship of some species (Sennertia sayutara, Sennertia devincta). Most species of the genus Sennertia settle on adult bees as heteromorphic deutonymphs, but the species Sennertia vaga has no deutonymph and settle on adult bees in the eating adult stages. Reproduction and feeding occurs during resettlement. Most species occur on small carpenter bees (Ceratina) and large carpenter bees (Xylocopa) of the family Apidae. A few species (Sennertia vaga-group) are associated with Centris (Paracentris) in the Neotropics.

Distribution 
Sennertia are found worldwide, except for in the Antarctic. (The species Sennertia antarctica is likely erroneously named, as the species of bee it parasitizes is not found in the Antarctic).

Species 
There are 6 subgenera and more than 70 species. The genus was discovered by the Dutch zoologist A.K. Udemans (Anthonie Cornelis Oudemans; 1858—1943).
 Sennertia aldeodadi - Haitlinger, 2000
 Sennertia alfkeni - Oudemans, 1900 (=Sennertia japonica (Oudemans, 1900))
 Sennertia americana - Delfinado and Baker, 1976
 Sennertia antarctica - Trägårdh, 1907
 Sennertia argentina - Vitzthum, 1941
 Sennertia augustii - Alzuet and Abrahamovich, 1990
 Sennertia basilewskyi - Fain, 1974
 Sennertia benoiti - Fain, 1974
 Sennertia bifida - Kurosa, 2003
 Sennertia bifilis - (Canestrini, 1897)
 Sennertia caffra - Vitzthum, 1919
 Sennertia cantabrica  - Zachvatkin, 1941
 Sennertia capensis - Fain, 1971
 Sennertia cerambycina - (Scopoli, 1763)
 Sennertia ceratinarum - Fain, 1974
 Sennertia congoicola - Fain, 1971
 Sennertia dalyi - Fain, 1980
 Sennertia dalyi nilotica - Fain, 1980
 Sennertia delfinadoae - Fain, 1981 (=Sennertia bakeri Ramaraju and Mohanasundaram, 2001)
 Sennertia devincta - Klimov and OConnor, 2007
 Sennertia dissimilis - Zachvatkin, 1941
 Sennertia donaldi - Turk, 1948
 Sennertia duweinii - Sherbef and Duweini, 1980
 Sennertia egyptiaca - Elbadry, 1971
 Sennertia elseni - Fain, 1971
 Sennertia faini - Baker and Delfinado-Baker, 1983
 Sennertia flabellifera - Oudemans, 1924
 Sennertia frontalis - Vitzthum, 1941
 Sennertia gargantua - Zachvatkin, 1941
 Sennertia greeni - Oudemans, 1917
 Sennertia haustrifera - Klimov and OConnor, 2008
 Sennertia herminae - Haitlinger, 1999
 Sennertia hipposideros - Oudemans, 1902
 Sennertia horrida - Vitzthum, 1912 ( equivalent to Sennertia sumatrensis Oudemans, 1924; Sennertia leucothorae Ramaraju and Mohanasundaram, 2001)
 Sennertia hurdi - Klimov and OConnor, 2008
 Sennertia ignota - Delfinado and Baker, 1976
 Sennertia indica - Delfinado and Baker, 1976
 Sennertia jeanalexi - Fain, 1971
 Sennertia koptorthosomae - Oudemans, 1901
 Sennertia latipilis - Fain, 1974
 Sennertia lauta - Klimov and OConnor, 2007
 Sennertia leclercqi -  Fain, 1971
 Sennertia leei - Fain, 1982
 Sennertia longipilis - Alzuet and Abrahamovich, 1987
 Sennertia loricata - Klimov and OConnor, 2008
 Sennertia lucrosa - Klimov and OConnor, 2008
 Sennertia madagascarensis - Fain, 1971
 Sennertia mesotrichia - Fain, 1971
 Sennertia micheli - Fain, 1971
 Sennertia monicae - Fain, 1971
 Sennertia morstatti - Vitzthum 1914 (=Sennertia moandensis Fain, 1971)
 Sennertia oudemansi - Zachvatkin, 1941
 Sennertia perturbans - Vitzthum, 1919
 Sennertia pirata - Klimov and OConnor, 2008
 Sennertia potanini - Zachvatkin, 1941
 Sennertia queenslandica Womersley, 1941
 Sennertia ratiocinator - Klimov and OConnor, 2007
 Sennertia recondita - Klimov and OConnor, 2008
 Sennertia robusta - Delfinado and Baker, 1976 (=Sennertia carpenteri Ramaraju and Mohanasundaram, 2001)
 Sennertia roepkei - Oudemans, 1924
 Sennertia sayutara - Klimov and OConnor, 2007
 Sennertia scutata - Fain, 1974
 Sennertia segnis - Klimov and OConnor, 2008
 Sennertia shimanukii - Baker and Delfinado-Baker, 1983
 Sennertia simplex - Trägårdh, 1904
 Sennertia sodalis - Klimov and OConnor, 2008
 Sennertia spinifera - Fain, 1974
 Sennertia splendidulae - Alzuet and Abrahamovich, 1989
 Sennertia surinamensis - Fain and Lukoschus, 1971
 Sennertia tanythrix - Fain, 1971
 Sennertia tunisiana - Fain, 1980
 Sennertia vaga - Klimov and OConnor, 2008
 Sennertia vanderhammeni brevipilis - Fain, 1974
 Sennertia vanderhammeni - Fain, 1974
 Sennertia varicosa - Fain, 1971
 Sennertia vitzthumi - Fain, 1981
 Sennertia zhelochovtsevi - Zachvatkin, 1941

References 

Acariformes